Elisabeth Baldauf  (born  3 August 1990) is an Austrian female badminton player. She represented her country at the 2016 Summer Olympics in Rio de Janeiro, Brazil.

Achievements

BWF International Challenge/Series
Women's Singles

Mixed Doubles

 BWF International Challenge tournament
 BWF International Series tournament
 BWF Future Series tournament

References

External links
 

1990 births
Living people
People from Bregenz
Austrian female badminton players
Badminton players at the 2016 Summer Olympics
Olympic badminton players of Austria
Sportspeople from Vorarlberg
21st-century Austrian women